Yustik (Ĵüs Tıt) is a rural locality (a selo) in Ust-Koksinsky District, the Altai Republic, Russia. The population was 300 as of 2016. There are 4 streets.

Geography 
Yustik is located near the Koksa River, 37 km northwest of Ust-Koksa (the district's administrative centre) by road. Krasnoyarka is the nearest rural locality.

References 

Rural localities in Ust-Koksinsky District